Felix Koenigs (18 May 1846, in Cologne – 24 September 1900, in Paris) was a German banker and art collector. In 1866, he joined the banking firm of Delbrück, Leo & Co., founded by Adelbert Delbrück, and became a full partner in 1878.

Biography
His father, Franz Wilhelm Koenigs (1819–1882), was a merchant and textile manufacturer. His older brother, became a board member of the A. Schaaffhausen'scher Bank Association in 1871, and his younger brother was the chemist, . His nephew, Franz Koenigs, was also a banker and art collector.

In the 1890s he was one of the founders and financiers of the Grunewald "villa colony" in Berlin, and owned several properties there. The  and the  there are named after him.

Several famous artists were his close friends, including Adolf Brütt, Max Klinger, Wilhelm Leibl and Hans Olde. The sculptor, Otto Lessing, was a neighbor of his, and they once travelled together to Venice, on an art buying expedition.

He went to visit the Exposition Universelle (1900) with Brütt and Klinger, but suddenly became ill and died there. Brütt helped convey his estate to the National Gallery. The sculptures by Auguste Rodin, and the paintings by Christian Landenberger and Giovanni Segantini, are in the "Foundation of Modernism" collection at the Gallery.

His family grave, designed by Ludwig Brunow, is in the Melaten-Friedhof in Cologne.

References 

1846 births
1900 deaths
German bankers
Real estate and property developers
German art collectors
People from Cologne